David C. Crowley (born May 14, 1986) is an American politician and the 7th County Executive of Milwaukee County, Wisconsin. He is the first African American to serve as the county's top official, and, at age 33, also the youngest.  He previously represented Milwaukee as a member of the Wisconsin State Assembly, serving from January 2017 until June 2020.

Biography

Born in Milwaukee, Wisconsin, Crowley's parents struggled with narcotics addiction in his youth and lost their home when he was just ten years old.  His parents eventually divorced, and he suffered eviction from two more homes before graduating high school.  Under the mentorship of Reggie and Sharlen Moore, and their community organizing group, Urban Underground, Crowley became interested in issues of policing and local government.  Crowley graduated from Bay View High School and attended the University of Wisconsin–Milwaukee from 2008 to 2012, though did not obtain a degree.

He worked as an organizer for United States Senator Russ Feingold on his 2010 re-election campaign, then became a legislative aide to Milwaukee County Supervisor Nikiya Harris Dodd.  When she was elected to the Wisconsin State Senate, he worked as her policy director in Madison.

Crowley made his first attempted at elected office in 2016, when he ran for Milwaukee City Council.  He came in third in the February nonpartisan primary election and did not advance to the general.  However, later that month, his employer, Senator Nikiya Harris Dodd, announced she would not seek re-election in the 6th district seat.  The move prompted Assembly member La Tonya Johnson to declare for that office, creating an open race in the 17th Assembly District.  Crowley jumped into the race and won the Democratic primary with 56% of the vote.  He was unopposed in the general election and entered office on January 3, 2017.  He would go on to win re-election in 2018.

In November 2019, after incumbent Chris Abele announced he would not seek re-election, Crowley announced his candidacy for Milwaukee County Executive.  In the February primary election, Crowley came in a close second to state senator Chris Larson, defeating County Board Chairman Theodore Lipscomb, Sr., and businesswoman Purnima Nath.  Crowley received the endorsement of outgoing executive Chris Abele, who had been challenged by Larson for his seat in 2016.  Abele would go on to spend heavily on behalf of Crowley in 2020 through his Leadership MKE political action committee.  The April election was significantly disrupted by the COVID-19 pandemic in Wisconsin, but when the votes were tallied on April 13, Representative Crowley narrowly defeated Senator Larson.

Crowley was sworn in as County Executive on May 4, 2020, from his front yard, due to ongoing shelter-in-place policies in the state. He resigned his seat in the Assembly effective June 18, 2020, as required to comply with a 2015 Wisconsin law prohibiting a person from simultaneously serving as a member of the legislature and a county executive.

In January 2021, Crowley was named to the Milwaukee Business Journal's "40 under 40" class of 2021.

Personal life and family

Crowley's parents recovered from their addiction struggles and remain involved in his life.  He married his wife, Ericka, in 2016, they have two daughters together as well as a daughter from Ericka's previous relationship.  Crowley is the vice chair of the Milwaukee chapter of the American Civil Liberties Union, and a member of the Milwaukee Urban League Young Professionals, and the Milwaukee NAACP.

Electoral history

Milwaukee City Council (2016)

| colspan="6" style="text-align:center;background-color: #e9e9e9;"| Primary Election, February 16, 2016

Wisconsin Assembly (2016, 2018)

| colspan="6" style="text-align:center;background-color: #e9e9e9;"| Democratic Primary Election, August 9, 2016

| colspan="6" style="text-align:center;background-color: #e9e9e9;"| General Election, November 8, 2016

Milwaukee County Executive (2020)

| colspan="6" style="text-align:center;background-color: #e9e9e9;"| Primary Election, February 18, 2020 

| colspan="6" style="text-align:center;background-color: #e9e9e9;"| General Election, April 7, 2020

References

External links
 Milwaukee County Executive
 Representative David Crowley at Wisconsin Legislature
 Crowley for Milwaukee campaign website
 
 

1986 births
Living people
Politicians from Milwaukee
Milwaukee County Executives
University of Wisconsin–Milwaukee alumni
African-American state legislators in Wisconsin
Democratic Party members of the Wisconsin State Assembly
21st-century American politicians
21st-century African-American politicians
20th-century African-American people